Nigel J. Ashton is professor of international history at the London School of Economics. He is a specialist in contemporary Anglo-American relations and the modern history of the Middle East. His book, Kennedy, Macmillan and the Cold War: the Irony of Interdependence (2002) won the Cambridge Donner Book Prize for excellence in advancing scholarly understanding of transatlantic relations.

Ashton earned his BA and his PhD at Christ's College, University of Cambridge.

Selected publications
Eisenhower, Macmillan and the Problem of Nasser: Anglo-American Relations and Arab Nationalism, 1955-59. Macmillan, London, 1996.
Kennedy, Macmillan and the Cold War: the Irony of Interdependence. Palgrave, 2002.
King Hussein of Jordan: A Political Life. Yale University Press, New Haven, 2008.

References

External links 
Nigel Ashton discussing his book on King Hussain of Jordan.

Academics of the London School of Economics
Living people
Year of birth missing (living people)
Alumni of Christ's College, Cambridge
British historians